59 Cygni is a multiple star system in the northern constellation of Cygnus, located roughly 1,300 light years away from Earth. It is visible to the naked eye as a blue-white hued star with a combined apparent visual magnitude of 4.74.

The primary component and brightest member of this system, designated 59 Cyg Aa, is a rapidly rotating Be star with a stellar classification of B1.5 Vnne. This is a well-studied star thanks to pronounced spectral variations that have been observed since 1916, and two short-term shell star phases that were observed in 1973 and 1974–5. It is actually a confirmed spectroscopic binary system with a high temperature subdwarf O-type companion in a 28-day orbital period. The latter is heating the nearest side of the circumstellar gaseous disk that surrounds the primary.

A fourth component is a magnitude 9.8 A-type giant star of class A8III at a separation of  along a position angle (PA) of 352°, as of 2008.

References

B-type main-sequence stars
Be stars
Gamma Cassiopeiae variable stars
5
Cygnus (constellation)
Durchmusterung objects
Cygni, 59
200120
0103632
8047
Cygni, V832